is a professional Japanese baseball player. He is an outfielder for the Chiba Lotte Marines of Nippon Professional Baseball (NPB).

References 

1997 births
Living people
Nippon Professional Baseball outfielders
Baseball people from Kanagawa Prefecture
Chiba Lotte Marines players